Alireza Arafi  (born 1956, in Meybod) is an Iranian Shia cleric and he is currently a member of the Guardian Council and also a member of the Assembly of Experts. He was former Chairman of Al-Mustafa International University, Qom Friday prayer leader and head of Iran's Seminary.

Biography 
Arafi was born in 1959 in the city of Maybod, in the province of Yazd His father, Mohammad Ibrahim al-Arafi, was a close friend Ruhollah Khomeini  Before the Islamic Revolution he used to be a preacher and a writer. Despite his lack of participation in the written test by the Guardian Council to participate in the Assembly of Experts, he was confirmed to the Assembly in the elections of 2015, thanks to the Article III of the Law regulating the Assembly of Experts elections in Iran, which allows a discretionary approval by the supreme leader of Iran to overrule the requirements of the Guardian Council .

Education 
Began his classical education in their own country. After reading some of the lessons of literature, in 1970, came to Qom and Where he completed his primary school education at the same time he began his seminary courses and Courses preliminaries and finished quickly. During these years he did not take part in the courses and the courses are also open philosophy to the fullest extent swept and Also had a significant presence in the ethics of their professors. He also attended seminary courses, learned Arabic and English and Studies in mathematics and philosophy did not open West and Many books that were common in those days in the field, swept and cooperation in the field of education offices and universities (University Research Institute) attended.

Professors 
His professors are as follows:
 Ali Meshkini
 Muhammad Baqir al-Sadr
 Kazem al-Haeri
 Morteza Haeri Yazdi
 Mohammad Fazel Lankarani
 Hossein Vahid Khorasani
 Jawad Tabrizi
 Abdollah Javadi-Amoli
 Morteza Motahhari
 Mohammad-Taqi Mesbah-Yazdi

Records and responsibilities 
 President of the International Center for Islamic Sciences and a member of the board of trustees
 President of the University Research Institute
 Educational Department in Imam Khomeini Institute
 Research Council of Qom Seminary
 Friday the city of Meybod
 Member of the Supreme Council of the Cultural Revolution
 Seminary president of Iran

Views
Arafi is strongly opposed to atheism and Christianity (especially house churches in Iran), which he considers forms of idolatry. He also is critical of how the seminary in Qom is run theologically.

External link 

 Alireza Aarafi Biography

References 

1959 births
Living people
Society of Seminary Teachers of Qom members
Iranian Shia clerics
People from Yazd Province
Critics of atheism
Critics of Christianity
Imam Khomeini's Educational and Research Institute
Academic staff of Al-Mustafa International University